Earl of Derby is a title in the Peerage of England. The title was first adopted by Robert de Ferrers, 1st Earl of Derby, under a creation of 1139. It continued with the Ferrers family until the 6th Earl forfeited his property toward the end of the reign of Henry III and died in 1279. Most of the Ferrers property and (by a creation in 1337) the Derby title were then held by the family of Henry III. The title merged in the Crown upon Henry IV's accession to the throne in 1399.

The title was created again, this time for the Stanley family, in 1485. Lord Derby's subsidiary titles are Baron Stanley of Bickerstaffe in the County Palatine of Lancaster (created 1832), and Baron Stanley of Preston in the County Palatine of Lancaster (1886). The courtesy title of the heir apparent is Lord Stanley. The 1st to 5th Earls also held an earlier Barony of Stanley, created for the 1st Earl's father in 1456 and currently abeyant; the 2nd to 5th Earls held the Barony of Strange created in 1299, currently held by the Viscounts St Davids; and the 7th to 9th Earls held another Barony of Strange, created in error in 1628 and currently held independently of other peerages.

Several successive generations of the Stanley Earls, along with other members of the family, have been prominent members of the Conservative Party, and at least one historian has suggested that this family rivals the Cecils (Marquesses of Salisbury) as the single most important family in the party's history. They were at times one of the richest landowning families in England.

The Earls of Derby have given their name to two important sporting events: the Epsom Derby (usually known simply as the Derby) in horse racing is named for the 12th Earl, while the Stanley Cup, the championship trophy of the National Hockey League, was presented to the Dominion of Canada in 1892 by the 16th Earl, during his tenure as Governor General of Canada.

The family seat is Knowsley Hall, near Liverpool, Merseyside.

Ferrers Creation
Ferrières in Normandy, the hometown of the de Ferrers family, was an important centre for iron and takes its name from the iron ore mines used during the Gallo-Roman period. Lord of Longueville, Normandy, and a Domesday Commissioner; he built Tutbury Castle and Duffield Castle and had large holdings in Derbyshire as well as 17 other counties. 

Robert de Ferrers, 1st Earl of Derby (1062–1139) was created Earl of Derby by King Stephen in 1138 for his valiant conduct at the Battle of Northallerton. He was married to Hawise de Vitre and died in 1139.

His son Robert de Ferrers, 2nd Earl of Derby (?–bef.1160) became the next earl and was married to Margaret Peverel. He founded Darley Abbey and Merevale Abbey.

His son William de Ferrers, 3rd Earl of Derby (died 1190) was married to Sybil de Braose. He rebelled against King Henry II and was imprisoned at Caen, Normandy. He died in the Crusades at the Siege of Acre.

He was succeeded by his son William de Ferrers, 4th Earl of Derby (died 1247) who married Agnes de Kevelioc (also known as Agnes of Chester), daughter of Hugh de Kevelioc, 3rd Earl of Chester.

He was succeeded by his son William de Ferrers, 5th Earl of Derby (died 1254) who married Sibyl Marshall and then Margaret de Quincy with whom he had his son and heir Robert de Ferrers, 6th Earl of Derby (1239–1279), who became the next Earl.

He rebelled against King Henry III and was arrested and imprisoned first in the Tower of London, then in Windsor Castle and Wallingford Castle, and in 1266 his lands and earldom were forfeited, including Tutbury Castle which still belongs to the Duchy of Lancaster. Through one line the descent of the Earls of Derby eventually gave rise to the Earls Ferrers. Laurence Shirley, 4th Earl Ferrers, was the only peer of the realm to be hanged for murder. Another familial line takes in the Baron Ferrers of Chartley descent.

Creation of Edward III
The large estates which were taken from Robert in 1266 were given by Henry III to his son, Edmund Crouchback; and his son, Thomas, Earl of Lancaster, also called himself Earl Ferrers. In 1337 Edmund's grandson, Henry of Grosmont (c. 1310 – 1361), afterwards Duke of Lancaster, was created Earl of Derby, and this title was taken by Edward III's son, John of Gaunt, who had married Henry's daughter, Blanche. John of Gaunt's son and successor was Henry Bolingbroke, who acceded to the throne as Henry IV in 1399. The title Earl of Derby then merged in the Crown.

The Stanley Creation

The Stanley family was descended from Ligulf of Aldithley, who was also the ancestor of the Audleys (see Audley-Stanley family). One of his descendants married an heiress whose marriage portion included Stoneley, Staffordshire – hence the name Stanley. Sir Thomas Stanley served as Lord Lieutenant of Ireland and represented Lancashire in the House of Commons. In 1456 he was summoned to the House of Lords as Lord Stanley. His eldest son Thomas Stanley, 2nd Baron Stanley, married Lady Margaret Beaufort, the mother of King Henry VII, and also Eleanor Nevill. The title of Earl of Derby was conferred on him in 1485 by his stepson Henry VII after the Battle of Bosworth Field where Thomas decided to betray King Richard III. The title may derive from the family's extensive lands in the hundred of West Derby, Lancashire, rather than the county or city of Derby.

His eldest son and heir apparent George Stanley, Lord Stanley (commonly called Lord Strange), married Joan Strange, 9th Baroness Strange and 5th Baroness Mohun, and was summoned to the House of Lords as Lord Strange in right of his wife.
Lord Derby was succeeded by his grandson Thomas, the eldest son of Lord Strange. He had already succeeded his mother as tenth Baron Strange and sixth Baron Mohun. He married Anne Hastings, daughter of Lord Hungerford and Hastings. The second Earl's son Edward became the 3rd Earl. He notably served as Lord High Steward at the coronation of Queen Mary of England in 1553 and was Lord Lieutenant of Cheshire and Lancashire.

Lord Derby was married four times. His second wife Dorothy Howard, daughter of Thomas Howard, 2nd Duke of Norfolk, supplied his heir Henry, the fourth Earl. He served as Ambassador to France and was one of the peers at the trial of Mary, Queen of Scots, in 1586. Lord Derby married Margaret Clifford, daughter of Henry Clifford, 2nd Earl of Cumberland, and his wife Eleanor, younger daughter of Charles Brandon, 1st Duke of Suffolk, and his wife Mary Tudor, daughter of King Henry VII. Both Lord Derby's sons succeeded to the earldom. The eldest son Ferdinando, the fifth Earl, was summoned to the House of Lords through a writ of acceleration in his father's junior title of Baron Strange in 1589. He also built Leasowe Castle, probably as an observation platform for watching horse races on the nearby sands. Lord Derby married Alice Spencer, but was without male issue. He died under mysterious circumstances and some have claimed that he was poisoned in order to prevent him from staking a claim to the throne of England through his maternal grandmother. On his death the baronies of Stanley, Strange and Mohun fell into abeyance between his three daughters.

He was succeeded in the earldom by his younger brother William, the sixth Earl. He was Lord Lieutenant of Lancashire and Cheshire and purchased from his nieces their claims in the Isle of Man. William married Elizabeth de Vere daughter of Edward de Vere, 17th Earl of Oxford. Their son James succeeded to the earldom on his father's death. In 1628, during his father's lifetime, he was summoned to the House of Lords through a writ of acceleration as Lord Strange, as it was believed that his father held this title. When it was discovered that this was a mistake, the House of Lords decided that there were two baronies of Strange, the original 1299 creation and the new, 1628 creation. James was a staunch Royalist. In 1643 he moved to the Isle of Man and established it as a Royalist stronghold. He was beheaded in Bolton, Lancashire by the Parliament forces in 1651. His wife was Charlotte de la Trémouille, daughter of Claude de la Trémoille, Duc de Thouars, who is known as the heroine who defended Lathom House in 1644 and the Isle of Man in 1651.

Their son Charles became the 8th Earl. He served as Lord Lieutenant of both Cheshire and Lancashire. Lord Derby married Dorothea Helena Kirkhoven, daughter of Jehan Kirkhoven, Lord of Heenvliet (in South Holland) and Baron de Rupa of the Netherlands. They had two sons who both succeeded to the earldom. The 8th Earl's eldest son William Richard George became the 9th Earl. He was also Lord Lieutenant of Cheshire and Lancashire. He married Elizabeth Butler, daughter of Thomas Butler, Earl of Ossory, and sister of James Butler, 2nd Duke of Ormonde. He had two daughters and one son. He outlived his son and on his death in 1702 the barony of Strange fell into abeyance between his daughters. He was succeeded in the earldom by his younger brother, James, the tenth Earl. He was a politician and served as Chancellor of the Duchy of Lancaster and as Captain of the Yeomen of the Guard. Like many of his predecessors, he was also Lord Lieutenant of Cheshire and Lancashire. In 1732 he succeeded his great-niece as 6th Baron Strange. Lord Derby was childless and on his death in 1736 the male line of the second Earl died out. He was succeeded in the barony of Strange, which could be passed on through female lines, by his first cousin once removed, James Murray, 2nd Duke of Atholl.

The earldom was inherited by his distant relative Sir Edward Stanley, 5th Baronet, of Bickerstaffe, a descendant of a younger brother of the second Earl, who became the 11th Earl of Derby (see below for earlier history of the Baronetcy). He had previously represented Lancashire in Parliament and after he succeeded in the earldom he served as Lord Lieutenant of Lancashire. Lord Derby married Elizabeth Hesketh. His residence was Bickerstaffe Hall near Ormskirk, Lancashire. The 11th Earl's younger brother was the Hon. and Rev. John Stanley, Rector of Bury Parish Church 1743–1778. Edward's eldest son, James, Lord Stanley, was commonly called Lord Strange. Edward outlived James (who died in 1771) and was succeeded by James' son Edward, the 12th Earl. He held political office as Chancellor of the Duchy of Lancaster and also founded The Derby horse-race. Lord Derby married Lady Elizabeth Hamilton, daughter of James Hamilton, 6th Duke of Hamilton. His second marriage was to a Drury Lane actress, Elizabeth Farren.

The 12th Earl's first marriage produced his heir Edward, the thirteenth Earl. He represented Preston and Lancashire in the House of Commons and in 1832, two years before he succeeded his father, he was raised to the peerage in his own right as Baron Stanley, of Bickerstaffe in the County Palatine of Lancaster. Lord Derby was also a natural historian and his zoological collections founded Liverpool Museum. He was also a patron of the arts, especially of the poet Edward Lear who wrote The Owl and the Pussycat for the Earl's children. He was married to Charlotte Hornby. In 1844, he had a church built on the Knowsley Estate, St. Mary the Virgin, where several Stanleys found their final resting place.

His son, Edward, succeeded him to become the 14th Earl. He is the most famous of the Earls of Derby. Known as a great parliamentary orator, he sat as Member of Parliament for Stockbridge, a seat bought by his father, Windsor and Lancashire North. In 1844 he was summoned to the House of Lords through a writ of acceleration in his father's junior title of Baron Stanley. Although at first a Whig, he later became a Tory and served three times Prime Minister of the United Kingdom. Lord Derby was married to Emma Wilbraham daughter of Edward Bootle-Wilbraham, 1st Baron Skelmersdale. They had a daughter and two sons, both of whom succeeded to the earldom. The eldest son Edward Henry, was a prominent politician and served under his father as Parliamentary Under-Secretary of State for Foreign Affairs and Foreign Secretary. He became Foreign Secretary again under Benjamin Disraeli. In 1880 he joined the Liberal Party and was Colonial Secretary under William Gladstone between 1882 and 1885.

His younger brother and successor, Frederick Arthur Stanley, 16th Earl of Derby, was a Conservative politician and held office as Secretary of State for War, as Colonial Secretary and as President of the Board of Trade. In 1886, seven years before succeeding his brother, he was raised to the peerage in his own right as Baron Stanley of Preston, in the County Palatine of Lancaster. He was also Governor-General of Canada between 1888 and 1893. In 1892, he purchased and donated the Stanley Cup, to be awarded to the "championship hockey club of the Dominion of Canada" each year. Lord Derby was married to Lady Constance Villiers, daughter of George William Villiers, 4th Earl of Clarendon.

He was succeeded by his son Edward, the seventeenth Earl. Like many of his ancestors he was a politician and notably served as Secretary of State for War. He was also Ambassador to France, and during this time followed his father's lead by donating the Lord Derby Cup, given each year to the winners of the French rugby league knockout competition. Lord Derby married Alice Montagu daughter of William Drogo Montagu, 7th Duke of Manchester. A pair of Memorial Gates were erected in 1958 on Knowsley Lane on the Knowsley Estate in his memory. His two sons, Edward Stanley, Lord Stanley, and the Hon. Oliver Stanley both became Conservative politicians and served together in the same cabinet in 1938. Lord Derby outlived his eldest son and was succeeded by his grandson Edward, the eldest son of Lord Stanley, who became the 18th Earl. He was Lord Lieutenant of Lancashire and also established Knowsley Safari Park in 1971. He married Isabel Miles-Lade, but died childless.  the titles are held by his nephew Edward Richard William Stanley, 19th Earl of Derby. He is the son of Hugh Henry Montagu Stanley, younger brother of the 18th Earl.

The Stanley Baronetcy, of Bickerstaffe in the County Palatine of Lancaster, was created in the Baronetage of England in 1627 for Edward Stanley. He was the great-grandson of the Hon. Sir James Stanley, of Cross Hall, Lathom, younger brother of the second Earl of Derby. This branch of the family is known as the "Stanleys of Bickerstaffe". Sir Edward Stanley's great-grandson, the fourth Baronet, represented Preston in Parliament. His son, the aforementioned fifth Baronet, succeeded as eleventh Earl of Derby in 1736. For further history of the baronetcy, see above.

James Stanley, son of the first Earl, became Bishop of Ely in 1506. He sent a small army into the Battle of Flodden, commanded by his alleged son Sir John Stanley who later entered the monastery of Westminster Abbey.

Edward Stanley, a descendant of Peter Stanley, younger son of the second Baronet, sat as Member of Parliament for Somerset West and Bridgwater.

The Earl of Derby owns Knowsley Hall and Greenhalgh Castle; they were the Lords of Mann, i.e. of the Isle of Man from 1405 until 1594.

Several Earls of Derby are buried in St. Mary's Church, Knowsley. Others are buried in the Derby Chapel at Ormskirk Parish Church.

The Barons Stanley of Alderley are members of another branch of the Stanley family. They are descended from the Hon. Sir John Stanley, third son of the first Baron Stanley. Also, Edward Stanley, 1st Baron Monteagle, was the younger son of the first Earl of Derby.

A boarding house of Wellington College was named 'Stanley' in honour of the 14th Earl. During his time at Wellington, the 17th Earl was a pupil of this house.

Earls of Derby, first Creation (1138)
Robert de Ferrers, 1st Earl of Derby (died 1139)
Robert de Ferrers, 2nd Earl of Derby (died 1162)
William de Ferrers, 3rd Earl of Derby (died 1190)
William de Ferrers, 4th Earl of Derby (died 1247)
William de Ferrers, 5th Earl of Derby (died 1254)
Robert de Ferrers, 6th Earl of Derby (1239–1266)
Edmund "Crouchback", Earl of Derby (1266–1296)

Earls of Derby, second Creation (1337)
Henry of Grosmont, 1st Earl of Derby (died 1361); also Duke of Lancaster (1351) and Earl of Leicester (1345)
John of Gaunt, 2nd Earl of Derby (1340–1399)
Henry (of) Bolingbroke, 3rd Earl of Derby (1367–1413) (became King Henry IV in 1399)

Barons Stanley (1456)
Thomas Stanley, 1st Baron Stanley (1405–1459)
Thomas Stanley, 2nd Baron Stanley (c. 1435 – 1504) (created Earl of Derby in 1485)

Earls of Derby, third Creation (1485)

Thomas Stanley, 1st Earl of Derby (–1504)
Thomas Stanley, 2nd Earl of Derby (1477–1521)
Edward Stanley, 3rd Earl of Derby (c. 1508 – 1572)
Henry Stanley, 4th Earl of Derby (1531–1593)
Ferdinando Stanley, 5th Earl of Derby (1559–1594)
William Stanley, 6th Earl of Derby (bef. 1584–1642)
James Stanley, 7th Earl of Derby (1607–1651)
Charles Stanley, 8th Earl of Derby (1628–1672)
William Richard George Stanley, 9th Earl of Derby (1655–1702)
James Stanley, 10th Earl of Derby (1664–1736)
Edward Stanley, 11th Earl of Derby (1689–1776)
Edward Smith-Stanley, 12th Earl of Derby (1752–1834)
Edward Smith-Stanley, 13th Earl of Derby (1775–1851)
Edward Geoffrey Smith-Stanley, 14th Earl of Derby (1799–1869)
Edward Henry Stanley, 15th Earl of Derby (1826–1893)
Frederick Arthur Stanley, 16th Earl of Derby (1841–1908)
Edward George Villiers Stanley, 17th Earl of Derby (1865–1948)
Edward John Stanley, 18th Earl of Derby (1918–1994)
Edward Richard William Stanley, 19th Earl of Derby (born 1962)

The heir apparent is the present holder's son, Edward John Robin Stanley, Lord Stanley (born 1998).

Stanley Baronets, of Bickerstaffe (1627)
Sir Edward Stanley, 1st Baronet (died 1640) (great-great-grandson of 1st Earl of Derby)
Sir Thomas Stanley, 2nd Baronet (1616–1653)
Sir Edward Stanley, 3rd Baronet (1643–1671)
Sir Thomas Stanley, 4th Baronet (1670–1714)
Sir Edward Stanley, 5th Baronet (1689–1776) (succeeded as 11th Earl of Derby in 1736)
For further Baronets, see above

Barons Stanley of Preston (1886)
Frederick Arthur Stanley, 1st Baron Stanley of Preston (1841–1908) (succeeded his brother as 16th Earl of Derby in 1893)
For further Barons, see above

Family tree of the earls of Derby (third creation)

See also
Baron Mohun
Edward Stanley, Lord Stanley
Baron Monteagle (1541 creation)
Baron Stanley
Baron Stanley of Alderley
Baron Strange
Oliver Stanley
Parliament Square

Notes

References

Kidd, Charles, Williamson, David (editors). Debrett's Peerage and Baronetage (1990 edition). New York: St Martin's Press, 1990,

Further reading
 

Coward, Barry. The Stanleys, Lords Stanley, and Earls of Derby, 1385–1672: The Origins, Wealth, and Power of a Landowning Family. (Remains Historical and Literary Connected with the Palatine Counties of Lancaster and Chester, 3d series, vol. 30) Manchester University Press (for the Chetham Society), 1983.

External links

Brief History of the de Ferrars family
The Origins of Some Anglo-Norman Families, Lewis C. Loyd, 1951

Earldoms in the Peerage of England

Forfeited earldoms in the Peerage of England
British and Irish peerages which merged in the Crown
Noble titles created in 1139
Noble titles created in 1337
Noble titles created in 1485